Joanne Geraldine O. Lorenzana, known professionally as JoAnne Lorenzana, is a Filipino recording and performing artist, songwriter and former model, best known as an exponent of Original Pilipino Music in the mid-1980s to the 1990s.

Biography
Lorenzana is a graduate of the University of the Philippines.

She was discovered by Filipino composer-singer-manager Nonong 'Dero' Pedero in 1984, who soon took the young singer under his management, employing her talent for commercial jingles. Prior to Lorenzana's formal foray into local Philippine entertainment, she front-acted for international acts held locally, such as Gloria Estefan and the Miami Sound Machine, Menudo (the former group of Ricky Martin) and the British jazz ensemble Shakatak. The following year, she was launched in a show billed as JoAnne: Her First Time to announce the entry of the pop artist into the music industry.

Lorenzana represented the Philippines at the 5th Asean Song Festival held in Singapore in 1988 and the 1st ASIA Song Festival, held in Nagoya, Japan in 1989. She sang the nationalistic song "Bayan Ko" which she revived in 1987 for PLDT and won for her the 'Best Revival Recording' for the Awit Awards (the Philippines' version of the Grammys).

Lorenzana's albums include Between Seasons (2009), which was recorded and mixed in the U.S., released under her own label NeoMONDE Productions and distributed in the Philippines under Universal Records Philippines Inc. Her song "My Everyday Valentine" was co-written with Jimmy Borja, who did the music; Lorenzana started writing the lyrics in 2016. The song was arranged in 2020 by Jimmy Antiporda.

Lorenzana's latest project is a virtual show "JoAnne Lorenzana@35: Love Songs & Lessons" slated for August of 2021 in celebration of the artist's 35 years in the Philippine Music Industry.

Discography

References

External links 
 Manila Bulletin” article- 
 Philippine Star article - 

 Manila Bulletin February 2009 
 Phil. Star article – December 2009 
 Manilla Standard article – March 2010 
 Valentine article – notes on Philippine celebrities (February celebrants) February 2009

External links
Defunct official website – archived 2013

Filipino women pop singers
Living people
People from Quezon City
Singers from Metro Manila
University of the Philippines alumni
1966 births
Vicor Music artists